A Mountain for Monique is a novel by F. J. Thwaites.

It was adapted for radio in 1965.

References

External links
A Mountain for Monique at AustLit

1964 Australian novels